Bad Santa is a 2003 Christmas comedy film directed by Terry Zwigoff.

Bad Santa may also refer to:

 Bad Santa 2, a 2016 dark comedy crime film and sequel to Bad Santa
 Bad Santa, the nickname of basketball player Kenny Brunner
 Very Bad Santa, a character in the TV series Happy!

See also 

 Santa (disambiguation)